The 1955 Campeonato Profesional was the eighth season of Colombia's top-flight football league. 10 teams compete against one another and played each weekend. Independiente Medellín won the league for 1st time in its history after getting 44 points. Atlético Nacional, the defending champion, was 2nd with 39 points.

Background
10 teams competed in the tournament: Atlético Manizales was dissolved and Unión Magdalena was penalized for withdrawing the previous championship, while Cúcuta Deportivo return to the tournament and Deportes Tolima debuted. Independiente Medellín won the championship for first time.

League system
Every team played three games against each other team, one at home, one away and the other one at the stadium of the team that was economically worse. Teams received two points for a win and one point for a draw. If two or more teams were tied on points, places were determined by goal difference. The team with the most points is the champion of the league.

Teams

Final standings

Results

Top goalscorers

Source: RSSSF.com Colombia 1955

References

External links
Dimayor Official Page

Prim
Colombia
Categoría Primera A seasons